Hidden Treasure is the title of the second studio album by Isis Gee. It was released in Poland on September 17, 2007 by Universal Music Polska. In light of her participation in the 2008 Eurovision Song Contest, the album was subsequently released in select countries in Europe, Japan and the United States. The album was produced by KK, Simon Gogerly and Simon Young.

KK co-produced three tracks on the album, which was mastered by Tim Young at Metropolis Studios in London, England.

Hidden Treasure reached #44 in the United States album chart and #56 in Europe despite being released twice in the same year, with the second release including her song For Life which was the song representing Poland at the 2008 Eurovision Song Contest and came 10th.

Track listing
Standard Edition

Bonus tracks
Eurovision Song Contest Edition
For life (Isis Gee) — 3:04

Charts

Singles

Unreleased songs
All songs are acknowledged in the American Congress. Songs were written by Tamara Gołębiowski, sometimes they are labeled as Tamara Diane Gołębiowski, Tamara Diane Wimer Gołębiewski, Tamara Wimer, Tamara Diane Wimer or Isis Gee. These are the songs that age can be assigned to the recording sessions for this album. Earlier recordings Isis cover the years 1989 to 2004.
 Adasiu (2005)
 Carry me home (2005)
 Falling up (2005)
 Fool's Gold (2005)
 I will (2005)
 Marry Up (2005)
 Seven days (2005)
 Sleep away the day (2005)
 Through his baby's eyes (2005)
 After midnight (2006)
 Behind the wheel (2006)
 Catch and release (2006)
 Come here and share my world (2006)
 Falling apart (2006)
 In my shoes (2006)
 Make me a witness (2006)
 No return policy (2006)
 Sometimes (2006)
 Sugar and spice (2006)

References

External links
TamaraGee.com

2007 albums
Tamara Gee albums